The Gakona River is a  tributary of the Copper River in the U.S. state of Alaska. Beginning at Gakona Glacier in the Alaska Range, it flows generally south to meet the larger river at the community of Gakona.

See also
List of rivers of Alaska

References

Rivers of Alaska
Rivers of Copper River Census Area, Alaska
Rivers of Unorganized Borough, Alaska